John Sigmund Podgajny (June 10, 1920 – March 2, 1971) was a Major League Baseball pitcher who played for five seasons. He played for the Philadelphia Phillies from 1940 to 1943, the Pittsburgh Pirates in 1943 and the Cleveland Indians in 1946.

He died on March 2, 1971, in Chester, Pennsylvania, and was interred at Saint Francis DeSales Cemetery in Lenni, Pennsylvania.

References

External links

1920 births
1971 deaths
Baltimore Orioles (IL) players
Baseball players from Pennsylvania
Birmingham Barons players
Burials in Pennsylvania
Chester High School alumni
Cleveland Indians players
Columbus Red Birds players
Major League Baseball pitchers
Milwaukee Brewers (minor league) players
Ottawa-Ogdensburg Senators players
Philadelphia Phillies players
Pittsburgh Pirates players
Sportspeople from Chester, Pennsylvania